Artistic swimming at the 2018 Asian Games was held at the Gelora Bung Karno Aquatic Stadium, Gelora Bung Karno Sports Complex, Jakarta, Indonesia from 27 August to 29 August 2018.

Only women's events were held in two competitions. China once again dominated the competition by winning all two gold medals ahead of Japan with two silver medals.

Schedule

Medalists

Medal table

Participating nations
A total of 94 athletes from 11 nations competed in artistic swimming at the 2018 Asian Games:

References

External links
Artistic swimming at the 2018 Asian Games
Official Result Book – Artistic Swimming

 
2018
2018 Asian Games events
Asian Games
International aquatics competitions hosted by Indonesia